The Khokh Range (Xoxis kedi; , Xoxy ragh) is a mountain range in the Caucasus Mountains of Georgia. The mountain range runs north of the Greater Caucasus Range, which is pierced by the gorges of the Ardon and the Terek with Truso Pass (3150m above sea level) . The Kazbek volcano is located on the Khokh Range.

Etymology 

The word "Khokh" means "mountain" in Ossetian language.

References

Mountain ranges of Georgia (country)
Geography of Mtskheta-Mtianeti
Mountain ranges of Russia
Landforms of North Ossetia–Alania